Steven D. Walt is a law professor at the University of Virginia School of Law. He teaches courses on contracts, sales/commercial paper, legal philosophy, bankruptcy and secured transactions.

Biography
Walt graduated cum laude with a B.A. from Kalamazoo College in 1976. Walt also holds an M.A. and Ph.D. in philosophy from the University of Chicago (received in 1978 and 1984, respectively).

He earned his J.D. from Yale Law School in 1988 and was an associate professor at the University of San Diego for three years. He joined the University of Virginia School of Law faculty after visiting for one year as a professor of law from the University of San Diego. He is currently the Percy Brown, Jr., Professor of Law and John V. Ray Research Professor of Law at the University of Virginia School of Law.

He has received several academic awards, including a Whiting National Fellowship in the Humanities. In addition, he has been a visiting research scholar at Nuffield College, Oxford, and an Amoco Foundation Term Assistant Professor of Legal Studies at the Wharton School of the University of Pennsylvania. He is a member of the American Society for Political and Legal Philosophy.

Publications

Books

Journal articles

References

20th-century births
Living people
Yale Law School alumni
University of Chicago alumni
Kalamazoo College alumni
University of San Diego faculty
University of Virginia School of Law faculty
Wharton School of the University of Pennsylvania faculty
Year of birth missing (living people)
Place of birth missing (living people)